The list of Kannada feature films released by the Kannada film Industry located in Bangalore, Karnataka in the 1940s.

See also
 Kannada cinema

References
 Kannada cinema database by University of Pennsylvania

External links
 Kannada Movies of the 1940s at the Internet Movie Database

1940s
Kannada-language
Films, Kannada